Luis Fernando Silva Ochoa (born 23 March 1989 in Morelia, Michoacán) is a Mexican footballer who plays as a defender.

He came up through the Monarcas youth systems and had a chance to debut for the first squad during the Apertura 2009 league tournament, thanks to manager Tomás Boy.

Silva has also been capped by the Mexico U-20 team during the 2009 CONCACAF U-20 Championship.

Honours
Morelia
Supercopa MX: 2014

External links

 

1989 births
Living people
Sportspeople from Morelia
Footballers from Michoacán
Mexican footballers
Toros Neza footballers
Association football defenders
Liga MX players
Ascenso MX players